İlkay Gündoğan (born 24 October 1990) is a German professional footballer who plays as a midfielder for  club Manchester City and the Germany national team.

Gündoğan came through VfL Bochum's youth academy. In 2008, he began playing for the club's reserve side before joining 1. FC Nürnberg the following season. He was then acquired by Borussia Dortmund in 2011, winning the double of Bundesliga and DFB-Pokal in his first season. In 2013, he helped die Borussen reach their first UEFA Champions League Final since 1997. After playing a total of 157 matches and scoring 15 goals for the club, Gündoğan signed for Manchester City for an estimated transfer fee of £21 million in the summer of 2016. He won the Premier League in 2018, 2019, 2021 and 2022, the EFL Cup in 2018, 2019, 2020 and 2021, and the FA Cup in 2019.

Gündoğan made his senior debut for Germany in 2011 after previously being capped by Germany youth teams at under-18, under-19, under-20 and under-21 levels. He was chosen in Germany's squads for UEFA Euro 2012, the 2018 FIFA World Cup, UEFA Euro 2020 and the 2022 FIFA World Cup.

Club career

Early career
Gündoğan was born in Gelsenkirchen, North Rhine-Westphalia to Turkish parents. His grandfather on his father's side was a "guest worker" who moved from Balıkesir, Turkey, to the Ruhr region of Germany to work as a miner. During this time, his wife stayed in Turkey with his children where they grew up and went to school.  In 1979, Gündoğan's father Irfan and his siblings came to Germany by family reunification, where he also found a job a short time later.
 
Gündoğan moved from VfL Bochum to 1. FC Nürnberg in 2009. In his fourth Bundesliga match, on 19 September 2009, away against Bayern Munich, he made his first assist. His first goal for the side came on 20 February 2010 in a home match, again against Bayern Munich.

Borussia Dortmund

On 5 May 2011, it was announced Gündoğan had signed a four-year contract with Borussia Dortmund for an approximate transfer fee of €4 million. He made his debut on 23 July in the DFL-Supercup against Schalke 04. After a goalless draw at the Veltins-Arena, he scored their first attempt in the penalty shootout, although Kevin Großkreutz and Ivan Perišić missed to hand Schalke the victory.

On 17 December, Gündoğan scored his first goal for Dortmund in a 4–1 victory away to SC Freiburg. He played once for the club's reserves on 22 February 2012, being replaced at half time by Rico Benatelli in an eventual 2–1 win over 1. FC Kaiserslautern II at the Stadion Rote Erde. On 20 March, Gündoğan scored a 120th-minute goal to defeat Greuther Fürth and send Dortmund into the final of the DFB-Pokal. He played the entire final on 12 May, a 5–2 victory over Bayern Munich which gave Dortmund their first domestic double.

In the 2012–13 season, Gündoğan was one of the central figures of Borussia Dortmund as they reached the final of UEFA Champions League. He was praised for his play in two semi-final games against Real Madrid. On 25 May 2013, he scored the equaliser from the penalty spot in the 69th minute to keep Dortmund's hopes alive against Bayern Munich in the 2013 UEFA Champions League Final played at Wembley Stadium, London. This was his first penalty kick in a game for Dortmund. Bayern Munich went on to win the match 2–1.

On 27 July 2013, Gündoğan scored a goal when he won the 2013 DFL-Supercup with Dortmund 4–2 against rivals Bayern Munich. In August, a back injury while on international duty required surgery, which eventually ruled him out for a full year. In April 2014, he signed a new contract, to keep him at the club until 2016.

On 28 April 2015, Gündoğan and Sebastian Kehl scored in a penalty shootout victory over Bayern Munich which sent Dortmund into the DFB-Pokal Final. Two days later, it was announced he and Borussia Dortmund would not be extending their contract after it expired after 30 July 2016. However, on 1 July 2015, he signed a contract extension to keep him at the club until 2017.

Manchester City

On 2 June 2016, Gündoğan signed a four-year contract with Premier League side Manchester City, for an estimated fee of £20 million. He was the club's first signing under former Bayern Munich manager Pep Guardiola. He made his debut on 14 September, playing for the first time in four months in a UEFA Champions League group stage game at home to Borussia Mönchengladbach. City won 4–0, and he won a penalty which was converted by Sergio Agüero. Three days later, Gündoğan started and scored with a low, right-foot shot against AFC Bournemouth in a 4–0 win at the City of Manchester Stadium. He scored a brace and set up an Agüero goal against West Bromwich Albion in a 4–0 win at The Hawthorns on 29 October 2016. He continued his run of form by scoring twice against Barcelona in a 3–1 win at home in the group stages of the Champions League.

On 14 December, in a Premier League match against Watford, Gündoğan was substituted in the 44th minute with knee ligament damage, with Guardiola stating he would be out injured for several months. It was later confirmed Gündoğan tore his cruciate ligaments in his right knee and would miss the remainder of the season.

On 16 September 2017, Gündoğan made his first appearance for Manchester City in nine months, appearing as a substitute in the team's 6–0 Premier League win at Watford. Three months later, he scored his first goal of the season with a header, assisted by Leroy Sané, which gave City the lead in a 4–1 win against Tottenham Hotspur. On 13 February 2018, he scored a brace, one goal in each half, as City routed FC Basel 4–0 in the away leg of their round of sixteen tie in the Champions League. On 4 March, he set two Premier League passing records in a 1–0 home win over Chelsea: those for most passes attempted (174) and most passes completed (167) in a single match; the previous holder of both records had been his club teammate Yaya Touré, who completed 157 passes from 168 attempts against Stoke City in December 2011.

In August 2019, he signed a new four-year contract with Manchester City.

On 21 September 2020, Gündoğan tested positive for COVID-19, meaning he would have to self-isolate for ten days. This was announced on the same day that Manchester City's first game of the season against Wolverhampton Wanderers was to be played. He scored his first Premier League goal of the season on 15 December 2020 in a 1–1 home draw against West Bromwich Albion. On 7 February 2021, he scored a brace in a 4–1 away league win over Liverpool, sealing City's first win at Anfield since 2003.

On 12 February 2021, he received the Premier League Player of the Month award for his outstanding performances throughout January. On 12 March 2021, he received the Premier League Player of the Month award for a second consecutive month, with four goals and one assist in five games. In doing so, he became the first player for Manchester City to win back-to-back awards for the club. He ended the season as Manchester City's highest goalscorer of the premier league season with 13 goals.

On 22 May 2022, he scored two goals in a 3–2 victory against Aston Villa on the final day of the 2021–22 season to clinch the Premier League title.

On 14 August 2022, he was voted on by his teammates as the new club captain, replacing the departed Fernandinho.

International career

After years of playing for the different youth teams, Gündoğan received his first call-up to the Germany senior team in August 2011 for a friendly match against Brazil, but did not feature in the game. On 11 October, he made his debut for Germany after coming on as a substitute for captain Philipp Lahm for the last six minutes of the 3–1 win against Belgium in a UEFA Euro 2012 qualifying match at the Esprit Arena, Düsseldorf.

In May 2012, he was selected by manager Joachim Löw for the German 23-man squad for UEFA Euro 2012 and was given the number two shirt. Germany reached the semi-finals, but Gündoğan did not feature.

On 26 March 2013, Gündoğan scored his first goal for Germany in a 4–1 2014 FIFA World Cup qualifier against Kazakhstan at the Grundig Stadion, Nuremberg. He scored his second goal in his next match, a friendly on 14 August at the Fritz-Walter-Stadion, Kaiserslautern, as Germany came from 0–2 down to draw 3–3 against Paraguay. However, he was taken off with a back injury in this match, ruling him out for an entire year, meaning he would miss the 2014 World Cup, which Germany would go on to win.

Gündoğan returned to international football in a 2–2 friendly with Australia on 25 March 2015. He participated in the Euro 2016 campaign, scoring in a 7–0 away win over Gibraltar on 14 June 2015 and a 3–2 win against Scotland at Hampden Park on 7 September 2015.

On 6 May 2016, it was announced Gündoğan would be unable to participate at the Euro 2016 final stages due to injury. He did, however, make the team's preliminary squad for the 2018 World Cup in Russia which was announced in May 2018. On 4 June 2018, Gündoğan was selected in Joachim Löw's final 23-man squad for the World Cup. On 19 May 2021, he was selected to the squad for the UEFA Euro 2020.

Style of play
Jürgen Klopp, Gündoğan's former coach at Borussia Dortmund, described Gündoğan as an "intelligent and complete midfielder with numerous strengths". Although Gündoğan had a tough start at Dortmund, where he admitted "things hadn't gone as well as I had thought", his "willingness to learn" and "great attitude", according to Klopp, allowed him to play a pivotal role in his later career at the club in the deep-lying playmaker role. He was able to fit into Dortmund's explosive playing style "by combining creativity and outstanding passing with the defensive attributes and tireless energy needed". In his earlier years, Gündoğan was often deployed as a wide midfielder, but later established himself in a more central role at Dortmund. Regarding this positional switch, he commented: "I came to the conclusion that playing wide wasn't my strength. I feel fine playing as a defensive or central midfielder, but I also believe that I can hold my own as a playmaker." In a 2016 UEFA profile, Philip Röber also noted that Gündoğan "excels in possession-based teams and can dictate a side's tempo." At Manchester City, Gündoğan further demonstrated his diverse qualities, including his vision, work-rate, technical skills, and versatility, by being deployed in a variety of midfield positions, including in a holding role. Although he was not as productive as his other midfield teammates statistically, specifically in terms of the number of goals and assists he recorded, he drew praise in the media for his ability to circulate possession and create space for other players. Despite his ability, however, he has often struggled with injuries throughout his career.

Personal life
Gündoğan's cousin Naz Aydemir, who was raised in Turkey, is a volleyball player for Fenerbahçe and the Turkish women's national team.

In May 2018, Gündoğan met President of Turkey Recep Tayyip Erdoğan in London, along with Mesut Özil and Cenk Tosun, two other English-based, German-born players of Turkish origin. Gündoğan was criticised for referring to the statesman as "my president", despite only being a citizen of Germany. The incident caused political controversy in Germany and Gündoğan was jeered by German fans when playing for the national team weeks later.

In October 2019, following Cenk Tosun's goal in a 1–0 home victory over Albania in a Euro 2020 qualifier, the Turkish international published a photograph on Instagram in which Tosun stated support for soldiers involved in the Turkish offensive into north-eastern Syria against Kurdish forces. The post was initially liked by Emre Can and Gündoğan, who are both German internationals of Turkish descent; however, they both later removed their likes. Regarding the incident, Gündoğan commented: "I took the like back when I saw that it was judged to be political," also adding: "Believe me, after what happened last year, the last thing I wanted was to make a political statement." Finally, he noted: "What is true is that I was pleased for my former Germany U21 teammate [Tosun] that he scored the winning goal."

Gundogan married Sara Arfaoui in 2022.

Career statistics

Club

International

Scores and results list Germany's goal tally first, score column indicates score after each Gündogan goal

Honours
Borussia Dortmund
Bundesliga: 2011–12
DFB-Pokal: 2011–12
DFL-Supercup: 2013
UEFA Champions League runner-up: 2012–13

Manchester City
Premier League: 2017–18, 2018–19, 2020–21, 2021–22
FA Cup: 2018–19
EFL Cup: 2017–18, 2018–19, 2019–20, 2020–21
FA Community Shield: 2018, 2019
UEFA Champions League runner-up: 2020–21

Individual
kicker Bundesliga Team of the Season: 2012–13
ESM Team of the Year: 2012–13, 2020–21
PFA Premier League Team of the Year: 2020–21
Premier League Game Changer: 2021–22
Premier League Player of the Month: January 2021, February 2021
UEFA Champions League Squad of the Season: 2020–21

References

External links

1990 births
Living people
Sportspeople from Gelsenkirchen
Footballers from North Rhine-Westphalia
German footballers
Association football midfielders
VfL Bochum II players
1. FC Nürnberg players
Borussia Dortmund players
Borussia Dortmund II players
Manchester City F.C. players
Regionalliga players
2. Bundesliga players
Bundesliga players
Premier League players
FA Cup Final players
Germany youth international footballers
Germany under-21 international footballers
Germany international footballers
UEFA Euro 2012 players
2018 FIFA World Cup players
UEFA Euro 2020 players
2022 FIFA World Cup players
German expatriate footballers
Expatriate footballers in England
German expatriate sportspeople in England
German people of Turkish descent
Sports controversies